Romance comics is a comics genre depicting strong and close romantic love and its attendant complications such as jealousy, marriage, divorce, betrayal, and heartache. The term is generally associated with an American comic books genre published through the first three decades of the Cold War (1947–1977).  Romance comics of the period typically featured dramatic scripts about the love lives of older high school teens and young adults, with accompanying artwork depicting an urban or rural America contemporaneous with publication. 
 
The origins of romance comics lie in the years immediately following World War II when adult comics readership increased  and superheroes were dismissed as passé. Influenced by the pulps, radio soap operas, newspaper comic strips such as Mary Worth, and adult confession magazines, Joe Simon and Jack Kirby created the flagship romance comic book Young Romance and launched it in 1947 to resounding success. By the early 1950s, dozens of romance titles from major comics publishers were on the newsstands and drug store racks. Young Romance, Young Love and their imitators differed from the earlier teen humor comics in that they aspired to realism, using first-person narration to create the illusion of verisimilitude, a changing cast of characters in self-contained stories, and heroines in their late teens or early twenties who were closer to the target audience in age than teen humor characters.

With the implementation of the Comics Code in 1954, romance comics publishers self-censored any material that might be interpreted as controversial and opted to play it safe with stories focusing on traditional patriarchal concepts of female behavior, gender roles, love, sex, and marriage.  The genre fell into decline and disrepute during the sexual revolution, and the genre's Golden Age came to an end  when Young Romance and its companion Simon and Kirby title Young Love ceased publication in 1975 and  1977, respectively.
  
In the new millennium, a few publishers flirted with the genre in various ways, including manga-styled romance comics based on Harlequin novels and Golden Age classics revamped with sarcastic dialogue.

History

Roots 
As World War II ended the popularity of the superhero comics diminished, and in an effort to retain readers comic publishers began diversifying more than ever into such genres as war, Western, science fiction, crime, horror and romance comics. The genre took its immediate inspiration from the romance pulps; confession magazines such as True Story; radio soap operas, and newspaper comic strips that focused on love, domestic strife, and heartache, such as Rex Morgan, M.D. and Mary Worth. Dating, love triangles, jealousy and other romance-related themes had been a part of teen humor comics (which emerged in the early 1940s) — featuring characters such as Archie, Reggie, Jughead, Betty, and Veronica, and the kids at Riverdale High School — before the romance genre swept newsstands.

Joe Simon and Jack Kirby's Young Romance 
Aside from the one-time publication of Mary Worth comic-strip reprints, romance as a comic-book genre was the brainchild of Joe Simon and Jack Kirby, two comics artists known for their superheroes, such as Captain America, and their kid gangs, such as the Young Allies. Simon was serving in the United States Coast Guard when he got the idea for romance comics: "I noticed there were so many adults, the officers and men, the people in the town, reading kid comic books. I felt sure there should be an adult comic book." Simon developed the idea with sample covers and title pages and called his production Young Romance, the "Adult Comic Book". Simon later noted he chose the love genre because "it was about the only thing that hadn't been done."

After the service, Simon teamed-up with former partner Kirby, and the two developed a first-issue mock-up of Young Romance. Bill Draut and other artists participated, with Simon and Kirby producing the scripts because they "couldn't afford writers." Rather than the dramatic comic strips, Simon took his inspiration from the darker-toned confession magazines such as  True Story from Macfadden Publications.

The finished book was delivered to Crestwood Publications' general manager Maurice Rosenfeld. Crestwood owners Mike Bleir and Teddy Epstein were enthusiastic and worked out a 50% arrangement with the creators. Profit sharing was unusual at the time, and Kirby later noted he and his partner were, in fact, the first to receive percentages.

The first issue of Young Romance was cover-dated September–October 1947, and beneath the title bore the tagline "Designed For The More ADULT Readers of Comics". The title sold 92% of its print run. With the third issue, Crestwood increased the print run to triple the initial number of copies. Circulation jumped to 1,000,000 copies a month. Initially published bimonthly, Young Romance quickly became a monthly and generated the spin-off, Young Love — together the two sold two million copies a month.  Kirby noted the books "made millions." The two titles were later joined by Young Brides and In Love, the latter "featuring full-length romance stories".

Subsequent publications 

Timely/Marvel brought the second romance title to newsstands with My Romance in August 1948, and Fox Feature Syndicate released  the third title, My Life True Stories in Pictures, in September 1948.

Fawcett Publications followed with Sweethearts (the first monthly title) in October 1948. Fawcett also published three issues of Negro Romance, which was notable for its eschewing of African-American stereotypes, telling stories interchangeable with those told about white characters.

By 1950, more than 150 romance titles were on the newsstands from Quality Comics, Avon, Lev Gleason Publications, and DC Comics. The DC Comics romance line was overseen by Jack Miller, who also wrote many stories. Fox Feature Syndicate published over two dozen love comics with 17 featuring "My" in the title—My Desire, My Secret, My Secret Affair, et al.

Charlton Comics published a wide line of romance titles, particularly after 1953 when it acquired the Fawcett Comics line, which included Sweethearts, Romantic Secrets, and Romantic Story. Sweethearts was the comics world's first monthly romance title (debuting in 1948), and Charlton continued publishing it until 1973.

Artists working romance comics during the period included Matt Baker, Frank Frazetta, Everett Kinstler, Jay Scott Pike, John Prentice, John Romita, Sr., Leonard Starr, Alex Toth, and Wally Wood. Marie Severin once was given the job at Marvel of updating the clothing from old 1960s romance comic stories for publication in the 1970s.

Romance comics sold well, and affected the sales of both superhero comics and confession magazines. The publisher of True Story admitted that magazines sales were being hurt by the upstart romance comics. The August 22, 1949, issue of Time reported that love comics were "outselling all others, even the blood and thunder variety ... For pulp magazines the moral was even clearer: no matter how low their standards for fiction, the comics could find lower ones."

By 1954, parents, school teachers, clergymen, and others taking an interest in the welfare of children, believed comic books were a significant contributor to the epidemic of juvenile delinquency sweeping America. While romance comics did not bear the contempt and scrutiny heaped upon crime comics and horror comics, the genre did provoke comment from a psychiatrist, Dr. Fredric Wertham.  In his book, Seduction of the Innocent, Wertham deplored not only the "mushiness" of the romance comics, but their "social hypocrisy", "false sentiments", "cheapness", and "titillation".  He claimed the genre gave female readers a false image of love and feelings of physical inferiority.

Decline and Golden Age demise 
Following the implementation of the Comics Code in 1954, publishers of romance comics self-censored the content of their publications, making the stories bland and innocent with the emphasis on traditional patriarchial concepts of women's behavior, gender roles, domesticity, and marriage. When the sexual revolution questioned the values promoted in romance comics, along with the decline in comics in general, romance comics began their slow fade. DC Comics, Marvel Comics and Charlton Comics carried a few romance titles into the middle 1970s, but the genre never regained the level of popularity it once enjoyed.  The heyday of romance comics came to an end with the last issues of Young Romance and Young Love in the middle 1970s.

Charlton and DC artist and editor Dick Giordano stated in 2005:

Decades later, romance-themed comics made a modest resurgence with Arrow Publications' "My Romance Stories", Dark Horse Comics' manga-style adaptations of Harlequin novels, and long-running serials such as Strangers in Paradise — described by one reviewer as an attempt "to single-handedly update an entire genre with a new, skewed look at relationships and friendships."

In popular culture 
Pop artist Roy Lichtenstein derived many of his best-known works from the panels of romance comics:
 Drowning Girl (1963) — Lichtenstein adapted the splash page from "Run for Love!", illustrated by Tony Abruzzo and lettered by Ira Schnapp, in Secret Hearts 83 (DC Comics, November 1962) 
 Hopeless (1963) — adapted from a panel from the same story, "Run for Love!", artwork by Tony Abruzzo and lettered by Ira Schnapp, in Secret Hearts 83 (November 1962) 
 Crying Girl (1963) — adapted from "Escape from Loneliness," pencilled by Tony Abruzzo and inked by Bernard Sachs, in Secret Hearts 88 (DC Comics, June 1963)
 Ohhh...Alright... (1964) —  also derived from Secret Hearts 88 (June 1963)
 In the Car (sometimes called Driving) (1963) — adapted from a Tony Abruzzo panel in Girls' Romances 78 (DC, September 1961)
 We Rose Up Slowly (1964) — based on a panel from Girls' Romances 81 (January 1962)
 Sleeping Girl (1964) — based on a Tony Abruzzo panel from Girls' Romances 105 (October 1964).

Analysis 

Romance comics were a product of the postwar years in America and bolstered the Cold War era's ideology regarding the American way of life. Central to this ideology was the perception of the American middle-class family as the symbol of affluence, consumption, and the spiritual fulfillment promised by the American way of life. Girls of the Cold War era were encouraged to grow up early and assume the roles of loving wives, concerned mothers, and happy homemakers. Female promiscuity, career ambition, and independence degraded the American ideal and were vilified.

The basic formula for the romance comic story was established in Simon and Kirby's Young Romance of 1947.  Other scriptwriters, artists, and publishers tweaked the formula from time to time for a bit of variety. Stories were overwhelmingly written by men from the male perspective, and were narrated by fictional female protagonists who described the dangers of female independence and touted the virtues of domesticity.

Women were depicted as incomplete without a male, but the genre discouraged the aggressive pursuit of men or any behaviors that smacked of promiscuity. In one story, the female protagonist kisses a boy in public and is thereafter labelled a "manchaser" to be avoided by decent boys. An advice page in one issue blamed female public behavior, flirting, and flashy dress for attracting the wrong sort of boys. Female readers were advised to maintain a passive gender role, or romance, marriage, and happiness could be kissed good-bye. 
 
In romance comics, domestic stability was made obviously preferable to passion and thrills.  Women who sought exciting outlets were depicted as suffering many disappointments before settling down (finally) to quiet home lives. In "Back Door Love", the heroine learns that the man she is infatuated with is a "rat".  She degrades herself to be with him, but comes to her senses and eventually marries an unexciting man who provides her with stability.  In "I Ran Away with a Truck Driver", the tale's small town heroine runs off with a handsome truck driver who promises her thrills. After being robbed and abandoned in Chicago, she returns home, chastened and wiser, to share the company of a decent local boy.

Careers were discouraged. Working women were depicted as unhappy and unfulfilled because careers complicated relationships and limited chances for marriage.  In one story, a female advertising executive makes it clear to her boyfriend her career comes first. After he leaves her in disgust, she realizes she does love him and drops her career to become a happy wife and mother. Romance comics made it clear that men were not attracted to working women, were bored with intelligent women, and preferred domestic homebodies.

Men, on the other hand, were depicted as naturally independent and women were expected to accommodate such men even if things appeared a bit suspicious. In one story, a wife suspects her husband of infidelity and leaves him only to discover later she was wrong (according to him). She returns to her husband and draws the conclusion that "love means faith in the face of any evidence, no matter how overwhelming". 
 
As real world young men went off to the Korean War, romance comics emphasized the importance of women waiting patiently, unflinchingly, and chastely for their return. In one war-colored tale, a woman who loves to social dance remains faithful to her boyfriend and marries him even though he loses a leg in the war.  The two will never dance together again, but it is clear that her sacrifice is as patriotic as that of her lover.

Romance comics plots were typically formulaic with Emily Brontë's Wuthering Heights a seeming inspiration. Many stories of the genre featured a young heroine torn between two suitors: one, a wild Heathcliff type who promised thrills and threatened heartbreak, and the other, a stolid but dull Edgar Linton type who oozed respectability, security, and social acceptance. Adolescent girls could harmlessly indulge their bad boy fantasies in such stories but, in truth, romance comics tried to be democratic in their depiction of bad boys, giving them a softer side and not depicting them as irredeemably bad.

Some plots depicted young women challenging social conventions and the patriarchal authority of fathers and boyfriends.  Parental concern found expression in romance comics for what were considered dangerous youth cultural artifacts like rock and roll. In "There's No Love in Rock and Roll" (1956), a defiant teen dates a rock and roll-loving boy but drops him for one who likes traditional adult music—much to her parents' relief. Teen rebellion stories such as "I Joined a Teen-Age Sex Club!", "Thrill-Seekers' Weekend", and "My Mother Was My Rival" were dismissed as "girls' stuff" at a time when crime, horror, and other violent comics were being regarded with suspicion by those concerned with juvenile delinquency and the welfare of the young.

Notable romance comics

Reprints
Comics historian John Benson collected and analyzed St. John Publications' romance comics in Romance Without Tears (Fantagraphics, 2003), focusing on the elusive comics scripter Dana Dutch, and the companion volume Confessions, Romances, Secrets and Temptations: Archer St. John and the St. John Romance Comics (Fantagraphics, 2007). To research the 1950s era of romance comics, Benson interviewed Ric Estrada, Joe Kubert and Leonard Starr, plus several St. John staffers, including editor Irwin Stein, production artist Warren Kremer and editorial assistant Nadine King.

In 2011, an anthology Agonizing Love: The Golden Era of Romance Comics, edited by Michael Barson, was published by Harper Design.  In 2012, many of Simon and Kirby's romance comics were reprinted by Fantagraphics in a collection entitled Young Romance: The Best of Simon & Kirby's 1940s-'50s Romance Comics, edited by Michel Gagné.

British romance comics 
Romance comics in the United Kingdom also flourished in the mid-1950s with such weekly titles as Mirabelle (Pearson), Picture Romances (Newnes/IPC),  Valentine (Amalgamated Press), and Romeo (DC Thomson). All four titles lasted into the 1970s. Other British romance comics included Marilyn (1955–1965), New Glamour (1956–1958), Roxy (1958–1963), Marty (1960–1963), and Serenade (1962–1963); all of which eventually merged into Valentine and Mirabelle (Valentine itself merged into Mirabelle in 1974).

In 1956–1957 DC Thomson launched a line of monthly romance titles: Blue Rosette Romances, Golden Heart Love Stories, Love & Life Library, and Silver Moon Romances. In April 1965, all four titles were merged into the single weekly Star Love Stories title, with one issue per month maintaining the cover logo from the original companion titles. Star Love Stories, which changed its name to Star Love Stories in Pictures in 1976, lasted until 1990.

The photo comic romance titles Photo Love and Photo Secret debuted in 1979 and 1980 respectively. They both eventually merged into another publication.

See also
List of romance comics
Shōjo manga

References

Notes

Citations

External links
 Young Romance at Don Markstein's Toonopedia. Archived from the original on December 18, 2011.

 Sequential Crush, a blog "devoted to preserving the memory of romance comic books and the creative teams that published them throughout the 1960s and 1970s"

 
Comics genres